The Neo-Concrete Movement (1959–61) was a Brazilian art movement, a group that splintered off from the larger Concrete Art movement prevalent in Latin America and in other parts of the world. The Neo-Concretes emerged from Rio de Janeiro’s Grupo Frente. They rejected the pure rationalist approach of concrete art and embraced a more phenomenological and less scientific art. Ferreira Gullar inspired Neo-Concrete philosophy through his essay “Theory of the Non-Object” (1959) and wrote the “Neo-Concrete Manifesto” (1959) which outlines what Neo-Concrete art should be. Lygia Clark, Hélio Oiticica, and Lygia Pape were among the primary leaders of this movement.

Background 
After World War I, Europe witnessed a boom of art movements based upon rationalism such as De Stijl and Bauhaus. Artists believed humanity would be able to achieve progress through its ability to reason. In Latin America, ideas of rationalist and non-objective art took root in the early 1950s in reaction to the muralism controversy. Governments such as the Mexican government utilized muralists to create propaganda. Under repressive Latin American governments, artists rebelled against the idea of aiding the political regime through figurative art; therefore geometric abstraction and concretism ushered in an art that did not connote anything political or have really any meaning at all.

Concrete Art was able to flourish beneath these repressive regimes because it held no political messages or incendiary material. In Brazil, ideas of rationalist art and geometric abstraction arose in the early 1950s following the establishment of a democratic republic in 1946.  The period from 1946 to 1964 is known as the Second Brazilian Republic. Groups such as Grupo Ruptura in Sao Paulo and Grupo Frente in Rio de Janeiro rose. Specifically Ruptura followed the ideal of pure mathematical art which does not connote meaning outside of what it is.

The Neo-Concrete art movement arose when Grupo Frente realized that Concretism was “naïve and somewhat colonialist” and an “overly rational conception of abstract structure.”

In 1961 as the political tides began to turn, the Neo-Concrete artists disbanded no longer content to limit themselves to this one philosophy. Lygia Clark and Hélio Oiticica, leaders of the Neo-Concrete movement, put their energy into Conceptual Art. Art historians often refer to Neo-Concretism as the precursor to Conceptual Art because of the foundation of “abstruse metaphysics.” On April 1, 1964, a military coup removed Joao Goulart and established a military government in Brazil until 1985. The increase of violence called for a new kind of art that had the potential to carry meaning and deconstruct traditional thought even further. This came in the form of Conceptual Art.

The Neo-Concrete Manifesto and pushback against Concretism 
Brazilian poet and writer Ferreira Gullar wrote the Neo-Concrete Manifesto in 1959 and described a work of art as “something which amounts to more than the sum of its constituent elements; something which analysis may break down into various elements but which can only be understood phenomenologically.” In contrast to the Concrete Art movement, Gullar was calling for an art that was not based upon rationalism or in pursuit of pure form. He sought works of art that became active once the viewer was involved. Neo-concrete art must disassemble the limitations of the object and “express complex human realities.”

While Concretism built its art upon the basis of logic and objective knowledge with color, space, and form conveying universalism and objectivity, the Neo-Concrete artists saw colors, space, and form as “not [belonging] to this or that artistic language, but to the living and indeterminate experience of man.” Though Neo-Concrete Art still maintained Concretism as the foundation for their ideas, Neo-Concretists believed objectivity and mathematical principles alone could not accomplish the Concretist goal of creating a transcendental visual language.

Neo-Concretists believed that artworks were not simply static representations or forms; rather “art should be like living organisms”  In Lygia Clark’s theoretical statement written to address the intentions of the Neo-Concrete artists, she explains that as artists they wish to “found a new, expressive ‘space’.” This movement believed that through a direct relationship between the artwork and the viewer this “new, expressive ‘space’” could be constructed. Neo-Concrete artists sought to create a multi-sensorial space which caused the spectator to feel more acutely their own body and existence.

Clark also wrote of how Neo-Concretism sought to decipher the nature of humanity by creating a “medium of expression” which allowed people to “become aware of unity as an organic, living whole.” It was not just restoring an awareness of the spectator’s body but also of humanity’s communal existence.

The first Neo-Concrete Exhibition was held in Rio de Janeiro in March 1959, and the exhibiting artists were Amilcar de Castro, Ferreira Gullar, Franz Weissmann, Lygia Clark, Lygia Pape, Reynaldo Jardim, and Theon Spanudis.

Neo-Concrete Manifesto 
This manifesto was written by Ferreira Gullar, and was signed by Amilcar de Castro, Ferreira Gullar, Franz Weissmann, Lygia Clark, Lygia Pape, Reynaldo Jardim and Theon Spanudis. It was published on 22 of March 1959 in Journal do Brazil.

Selected artworks 
 Hélio Oiticica, Inventions, 1959, 30 x 30 cm wooden plaques. Oiticica sought to use the element of color in order to “escape the constraints of painting while remaining in dialogue with it,” and wanted his Inventions to embody rather than simply illustrate light.
 Lygia Clark, Cocoons, 1959, metal. Clark cut one piece of metal and folded it irregularly in order to open “up the pictorial support toward the viewer.” This work made the viewer deal with the tension between form and space.
  (1959)
 Lygia Pape, Book of Creation, 1959, 30 x 30 cm pages assembled. This book served as a creation narrative that played off of the subjectivity and interpretation of the viewer.

Neo-Concrete art exhibitions
 1959: Bienal, São Paulo
 1959: Exposição Neoconcreta, Bahia
 1960: II Exposição Neoconcreta, Rio de Janeiro
 1960: Venice Biennale, Venice
 1960: Konkrete Kunst, Zürich
 1961: Bienal, São Paulo
 1961: Exposição Neoconcreta, São Paulo

Further reading
 
   – Exhibition catalog of Cold America, Geometric Abstraction in Latin America (1934–1973), Fundación Juan March, Madrid, February 11-May 15, 2011
   – Folleto de la expoción celebrada América fría. La abstracción geométrica en Latinoamerica (1934–1973) en la Fundación Juan March en Madrid del 11 de febrero al 15 de mayo de 2011
 Olivier Berggruen, ed., Playing With Form: Neo Concrete Art From Brazil (New York: Dickinson Roundell, 2011). (Features essays by Berggruen and Yve-Alain Bois.)

References

Brazilian art
Art movements